Dirck van Bergen (1645, Haarlem – c. 1700, Haarlem) was a Dutch Golden Age landscape painter.

Biography
According to Houbraken he was a pupil of Adriaen van de Velde, who copied his style very well. He was a popular man who spent his money as easily as he earned it, and spent some time in England, but died in Haarlem.

According to the RKD his work later influenced Wilhelm von Kobell.

References

 Dirk van Bergen on Artnet

External links

1649 births
1700s deaths
Dutch Golden Age painters
Dutch male painters
Dutch landscape painters
Artists from Haarlem